South Asia has many traditional games and sports. Two of them, kabaddi and kho-kho, are played at the South Asian Games, with kabaddi also featuring at the Asian Games. Many of these games are played across the entire subcontinent under different names and with some rule variations, while some of these games may be played only in certain countries or regions.

History 
Some traditional South Asian games, such as kabaddi, kho-kho, and atya-patya, are believed to be thousands of years old, dating back to ancient India. Many South Asian games likely reflect characteristics of traditional life in South Asia; for example, the Bengali hopscotch game of ekka-dokka (related to Stapoo and Chindro) may reflect the concepts of land division and ownership of property in ancient times.

After the British colonisation of South Asia which peaked in the 1800s and afterwards, British and European sports such as cricket, football, and hockey began to be followed to a greater extent, to the detriment of the traditional games. The modern advent of urbanisation, globalisation (which attracted people towards more globally popular games), and technology (which gave people digital forms of entertainment such as the Internet, television, and video games) have further diminished the traditional South Asian sports. Additional reasons include religious extremism in some areas, which has restricted people from playing certain games, and lack of governmental support.

However, some professional leagues are now being started for certain traditional sports, such as the Pro Kabaddi League and Ultimate Kho Kho, which are beginning to revive interest in these sports and even globalise them.

Traditional games

Gillidanda 
Gillidanda or gulli danda is a game where players attempt to hit a stick as far as possible to score points. It has similarities to the popular South Asian sport of cricket, as well as to traditional games around the world, such as tipcat.

Chindro 
Chindro or Cheendro (related to ekka dokka in Bangladesh) is a game similar to hopscotch. Players attempt to move a rock through a series of boxes while hopping on one foot.

Gutte 
Gutte (similar to Meergati and Bilghotti in Pakistan) involves players throwing up and then grabbing stones on the ground, while ensuring none of the stones falls from the air to the ground.

Dark room 
Dark room is the same as hide-and-seek, except that it is played in an entirely dark room.

Donkey Donkey 
Donkey Donkey (similar to the Pakistani Beech ki Billi) is a game in which two players attempt to throw a ball to each other, while a player in the middle tries to catch it.

Maram pitti 
Maram Pitti (similar to Pakistan's Maran Kuttai) is similar to dodgeball.

Ball games

Seven stones 
In the game of seven stones (known by several other names in various regions), one team throws a ball at a pile of stones and then attempts to rebuild the pile, while the other team tries to eliminate the first team's players by throwing the ball at them.

Variations of tag

Kabaddi 
In kabaddi, an offensive player tries to enter the other team's half of the field, tag as many of their players as possible, and then return without being tackled to score points.

Kho-kho 
Kho-kho is a team sport that involves the offensive's teams players facing various restrictions while attempting to tag their opponents.

Freeze tag 
Freeze tag (also known as Baraf Paani in India and Pakistan, and as Borof Paani in Bangladesh) involves players becoming "frozen" in place when tagged by an opponent, but becoming unfrozen when tagged by a teammate.

Atya-patya 
In atya-patya (related to Dariabandha in Bangladesh), players attempt to advance up and down the field without being tagged by opponents.

Langdi 
In Langdi (also known as Langri Paala in Pakistan), players attempt to tag opponents while hopping on one foot.

Aankh micholi 
Aankh micholi (similar to Bangladesh's Kanamachi) is a form of blindfolded tag.

Kokla chappaki 
This game (similar to Rumal Chor and Bengal's Rumal Churi) is similar to duck, duck, goose.

Oonch Neech

Board games

Snakes and ladders

Carrom

See also 

 Traditional games of India
 Traditional games of Bangladesh
 Traditional games of Pakistan
 Traditional games of Sri Lanka

References 

Traditional sports